Jebli (Jebelia) is a pre-Hilalian Arabic dialect spoken in the mountains of northwestern Morocco. 

The historical development of this Moroccan dialect is unclear. 

The word jebli means "of/from the mountain".
Jbalas: all its 44 tribes speak Jebli Arabic;
Ghomaras: out of nine tribes, seven are fully Jebli-speaking, the two remaining are partially Jebli-speaking, with a significant Ghomara Berber-speaking community;
Sanhajas de Srayr: two Jebli-speaking tribes – Ketama and Aït Seddat – out of ten tribes, the remaining (eight) speak Sanhaja Berber;
Riffians: out of twenty tribes, six are fully or partially Arabophone; among them, five speak Mountain Arabic − Targuist, Aït Itteftf, Aït Boufrah, Mestasa and Metioua − while the last one (Settout) speak Hilalian Arabic;
Ghiatas, Maghraouas and Meknassas: the three tribes –that aren't part of any larger confederacy– are fully Jebli-speaking;
Tribes of Zerhoun (Zerahnas) and the neighborhood of Sefrou (Kechtala, Behalil and Yazgha): although not belonging to the same ethno-linguistic group than Jebalas, their pre-Hilalian dialects are sometimes classified as belonging to the same macro-family (westernmost pre-Hilalian village dialects) as Jebli.

Jebli is heavily influenced by Berber; the grammar of Jebli is almost Berber while most of the words are Arabic. The vocabulary is highly influenced by Spanish.

Examples of Jebli

See also
Varieties of Arabic
Pre-Hilalian Arabic dialects
Maghrebi Arabic
Jijel Arabic

References

Languages of Morocco
Maghrebi Arabic
Moroccan Arabic